Anphabe.com is a Vietnamese social networking service and employment website. It is the largest online network of management professionals in Vietnam. 

Anphabe has been referred to as the Vietnamese LinkedIn.

History
Anphabe.com was started by Thanh Nguyen, one of the few female tech founders in Vietnam, in 2011 in Ho Chi Minh City.

In 2013, Anphabe received investment from Recruit Global Incubation Partners, the venture capital arm of Recruit Holdings, a recruiting company out of Japan.

In 2014, the company launched a review of the best company to work for in Vietnam.

References

External links
Official Website
JobPed Website

Recruit (company)
Employment websites
Information technology companies of Vietnam
Business services companies established in 2011
Internet properties established in 2011
Vietnamese social networking websites